A dryer ball is a spherical laundry device for tumbling clothes dryers used as an alternative to fabric softener, reducing static electricity or softening clothing, or to accelerate the drying process.

Material composition 
Dryer balls are typically manufactured out of felted wool (the original material used for manufacture), rubber, or plastic. Wool variants are typically smooth, while rubber or plastic variants typically include spiked protrusions and may be shaped differently than a sphere. Rubber and plastic balls are more durable than woolen ones, which need periodic replacement depending on frequency of use.

Mechanism of action 
Dryer balls are said to act as a moving buffer, preventing wet laundry from coalescing in the dryer, allowing increased air flow. The material and design of the ball varies its properties: wool balls are said to absorb moisture, accelerating drying. Conventional fabric softener often gives a fragrance via aroma compound to clothing. While typically unscented by default, wool dryer balls can be used to perfume laundry via application of essential oils to the balls before use.

Disputed efficacy 
The efficacy of plastic dryer balls was disputed by Popular Mechanics who, in 2009, published experiment results in which staff were unable to find any beneficial effects.

Purported benefits

Eco-friendly 
Dryer balls are touted to be environmentally friendly for varying reasons versus conventional fabric softeners. Conventional softeners primarily function chemically, employing quaternary ammonium cation or stearic acid, which is either suspended in liquid or applied to polyester in the case of dryer sheets. Dryer balls function mechanically  and are reusable, compared to dryer sheets which are typically one-use products. Wool dryer balls are typically biodegradable, however can sometimes be chemically altered or bleached, reducing eco-friendliness. The increased drying speeds claimed by using dryer balls helps reduce energy use.

Hypoallergenic 
Dryer balls are sometimes touted as hypoallergenic or better for those with sensitive skin as they typically do not apply artificial softening agents or fragrances to clothing. The Environmental Working Group says to avoid essential oils used to perfume some wool dryer balls, as some oils are known to cause skin reactions.

See also
 Fabric softener
 Laundry ball
 Washing machine

References

Cleaning products
Laundry drying equipment